Ashton Hurst is an electoral ward of Tameside, England. It is represented in Westminster by Angela Rayner Labour MP for Ashton-under-Lyne.

Councillors 
The ward is represented by three councillors: Dolores Lewis (Lab), Mike Glover (Lab), and Leigh Drennan (Lab).

 indicates seat up for re-election.

Elections in 2010s

May 2018

May 2016

May 2015

May 2014

May 2012

May 2011

May 2010

Elections in 2000s

May 2008

May 2007

May 2006

June 2004

References 

Wards of Tameside